Camden County College (CCC) is a public community college in Camden County, New Jersey. Camden County College has its main campus in the Blackwood section of Gloucester Township, with satellite locations in Camden, Cherry Hill and Sicklerville. The college offers Associate in Arts, Associate in Science, and Associate in Applied Science degree programs and certificate programs.

History

In 1962, a New Jersey State law enabled the establishment of colleges by counties. Camden County created a college board in 1964 and a voter referendum, in 1965, approved the creation of a county college. In 1966, the Freeholders of Camden County charged Harry Benn, then secretary of the Camden County College Board, and a small commission to find land capable of maintaining a college in the central part of the county. The Salvatorian Fathers, who ran the Mother of the Savior Seminary, were looking to sell the land and close down the facility.

The only surviving seminary building, Jefferson Hall, is used by Rutgers University's School of Health Professionals. Jefferson hall survived due its architecture, The Three buildings form an "U" shape with a small central courtyard. The 1969 graduation commencement took place in the courtyard of the three major buildings. Currently, a small memorial to the Mother of the Savior Seminary resides in that courtyard. In 1967, Wilson Hall served as an administrative center, library, cafeteria and activity room. Jefferson Hall served as the main Science Building. Originally, there was a pond and creek on campus which later included a series of waterfalls, lounge beaches, and pedestrian walks.

Otto R. Mauke was chosen to be the first president of the college in March 1967 and his staff moved into Washington Hall in June 1967. First Day of classes for the college was on September 25, 1967 only six months from the founding of the college.

Development

Founded in 1967, Camden County College was composed of one campus with seven academic programs and a handful of buildings. Three original buildings are still in use. The original enrollment was less than 500 students. In 1969, the college opened its first campus in Camden City. In 1970, the college began its first multimillion-dollar expansion. The nine million dollar (1969 dollars) $58,857,302.45 in (2016 dollars) project constructed new buildings, all of which are still in use, including Madison Hall, Taft Hall, Wolverton Library, the Community Center, the Papiano Gymnasium, and Truman Hall.

During the 1970s, the Blackwood campus added several more buildings and programs. The Camden City campus moved several times to larger locations.

In 1989, the Blackwood campus underwent another round of expansion. The college added a manufacturing technology building, a Laser Institute building, and a Child Care center. Also in 1989 a new campus, a multistory tower, began construction in Camden City.

In 2000, the Rohrer Center was opened in Cherry Hill, NJ, creating the third campus for the college. In 2004, a second building was added to the Camden City Campus. In 2005, the county made an $83 million investment ($103,913,755 in 2016 dollars) known as the Freeholder Initiative, in order to update and renovate the college campuses, representing the largest investment in the college since its founding.  
Since 2005 renovation has modernized the Blackwood campus. A "ring road" was constructed to allow for better traffic flow and parking, Madison Hall was renovated to allow for modern technology and equipment, the Madison Connector was built as a public space, a new science building was constructed, Taft Hall was renovated, and new "green" initiatives were started in order to make the campus more energy efficient.

In 2011, The Technical Institute of Camden County and the Regional Emergency Training Center were incorporated into the College, bringing all of Camden County's educational services under one organization.

In the fall 2014 Taft Hall became the main student registration and advisement center and was named the Louis Cappelli Student One Stop.

In 1967 the college began with less than 500 students. The first graduating class was 172 students in 1969. Enrollment expanded, by 2011, to over 15,000 students and 1,800 graduates.

Presidents

Otto R. Mauke
The first president of Camden County College was Otto R. Mauke who served from 1967 until 1987.  He was named President Emeritus and, in 2009, the college union was renamed the Otto R. Mauke Community Center. During his tenure the college grew from 500 students in 1967 to 8,000 students. He was an important part in expanding Camden County College into Camden City and extending college credit classes to pre-college students. He died in 2009. Currently, there are two display cases of personal-professional affects including a poem writing by a student, two gift pen sets (the first given in 1967 with the opening of the school the second presented on his final day and set to May 8, 1987) and a diorama of his office designed by Camden County College employee Sharon Yancey.

In 2010, Leah Mauke contributed $50,000 to start a scholarship endowment in honor of Dr. Mauke. The endowment represents the largest individual donation to Camden County College.

Robert W. Ramsay
Robert W. Ramsay served as president of Camden County College from 1987–1993. During his tenure the college built a new campus in Camden city at Cooper and Broadway. He also expanded the technical facilities at the main campus located in Blackwood, New Jersey. A dedicated Criminal Justice Center was built as was the Laser Institute of Technology and the Helen Fuld School of Nursing.

Phyllis Della Vecchia
Phyllis Della Vecchia served as president of the college from 1993–2006. During her presidency Camden County College built a third campus in Cherry Hill, New Jersey. The Camden city campus was expanded to include the Camden Technology Center. During her tenure the campus attained rankings as one of the larger community colleges in the country being in the top 100 in growth, enrollment and degrees granted.

Raymond Yannuzzi
Raymond Yannuzzi served as president of the college from 2006–2016. He was hired as Vice President of Academic Affairs in 2000 and became president of the college in 2006. The New Jersey Council of County Colleges honored Dr. Yannuzzi with a 2005 Community College Spirit Award in recognition of his exemplary service to the state's community colleges. He was cited for his leadership in developing the New Jersey Pathways Leading Apprentices to College Education Program, which connects registered apprenticeships in building/construction trades to college degree programs. Also acknowledged were his instrumental role in forming the Shipyard College Consortium of Philadelphia-area colleges, which helped bring commercial shipbuilding and other economic development activities to the Philadelphia Naval Shipyard. During his presidency the school has expanded its online classes and partnered with WHYY Public Television Philadelphia in order to share content. Dr. Yannuzzi has also served on the advisory councils of the Rowan University College of Education and the New Jersey Italian and Italian American Heritage Commission.

Donald Borden
Donald Borden is the current president of the college. He became president of the college in 2016.

Campuses

Main campus in Blackwood

The Main Academic Campus of Camden County College is located in Blackwood, New Jersey. It was founded in 1967 on land formerly belonging to the Mother of the Savior Seminary. The campus currently contains about twenty (20) academic buildings.

The main academic buildings include:
 Madison Hall for liberal arts, cafeteria and community center 
 Taft Hall for academic advisement, registration, computer lab and ESL and basic skills classes
 The Gabriel E. Danch CIM Center for engineering, fabrication, computer graphics and film production
 Lincoln Hall (which contains the Dennis Flyer Theater) for fine, performing and communication arts
 Jefferson Hall closed for renovations, bought by Rutgers in late 2016/early 2017
 Roosevelt Hall for administration  
 Wilson Hall which is currently abandoned awaiting to be demolished
 Truman Hall for automotive studies, speech and basic math
 Adams Hall for wrestling

Wolverton Library
The Wolverton Library is a mixed use four story building. It consists of the traditional library facility and a computerized testing center, student study areas including quiet rooms for group study, ERIC has hold of the third and some of the second floor space The facility also hosts several areas for committee and conference discussions.

The Wolverton Library contains over 40,000 volumes and print journals covering three floors of the building. Students and staff have access to the county library system which allows access to any volume in the Camden County public library system. The Wolverton Library also provides access to an extensive online e-book collection of over 100,000 volumes and research journals. Through the CollegeAnywhere system students also have access to hundreds of hours of educational video services including PBS documentaries. The library also maintains subscriptions to over thirty five popular and academic magazines.

Recent additions
 Madison Connector Building
The Madison Connector Building is a construction project begun simultaneously with the renovation of Madison Hall. The Connector is a three story breezeway-office-classroom facility linking Madison Hall with the College Community Center. It features a dramatic curved exterior. Madison Connector contains a lecture theater, an amphitheater, high-tech classrooms and office spaces.“smart” technologies fill the building, providing state-of-the-art wireless and hard-wired teaching spaces and presentation capabilities. The most visually appealing part of the Madison Connector is the Atrium; a three story open space paneled, on three sides, by tall glass walls allowing the Atrium to be sunlit throughout the day. As such, it has become the gathering space for students. Construction was begun in 2005 and completed in Fall of 2008.

The Madison Connector building houses Civic Hall and The Forum – two high-technology meeting/conference/lecture spaces which serve as the hub for the presentations given by the Center for Civic Leadership and Responsibility. Civic Hall is a 315 stadium seat lecture hall containing a full presentation room in the back and multiple cameras and projectors. The Forum is a 40-seat amphitheater built to be reminiscent of both the Roman Forum and Medieval Observation Classrooms. The Forum is also outfitted with modern presentation equipment.

 Kevin G. Halpern Hall for Science and Health Education
This science building is a $30 million capital project. It had its groundbreaking on October 26, 2010 and had its dedication on April 12, 2013. College President Raymond Yannuzzi gave the opening remarks and was followed by honored guests including several members of the Camden County Board of Freeholders and the College Board of Trustees and other guests including U.S. Representative Robert E. Andrews, D-NJ, and New Jersey State Senator Donald Norcross. Also attending and giving brief remarks were Camden County Freeholder Director Louis Cappelli Jr, Freeholder Jeffrey L. Nash, Freeholder Ian K. Leonard, Gloucester Township Mayor David R. Mayer, and CCC trustee chair Kevin G. Halpern.

The Building is named after Kevin Halpern, the chairman for the Camden County College Board of Trustees from 1996 until his death in September 2012.

Camden City Campus, Camden Technology Center
Located in Camden City at the nexus of Broadway and Cooper Street, Camden County College has built two facilities.  Camden County College opened a campus in Camden City in 1969 when it created an evening program for citizens who had not finished high school. In 1970 a new set of classrooms and offices was opened at Carmen Street in Camden City. In 1973, the Camden City campus expanded to a new building at 319 Cooper Street. In 1978, the Camden City campus expanded again through a move to a new facility located at Seventh and Cooper streets. This remained the location of the city campus until 1991 when the campus was moved to its current location, at the corner of Broadway and Cooper streets, and is known as College Hall.

College Hall is a five-story, fifty thousand sq. foot building. It houses liberal arts classrooms, an art room, a science laboratory, a child care center, computer rooms, and offices for student services.

In 2004, the Camden Technology Center (CTC) opened across the street from College Hall. The CTC is a US$19.6 million,  facility built as part of the Camden Rehabilitation and Economic Recovery Act. The purpose of the facility is to create a space for the teaching and learning of technology-driven careers in health, business and technology fields. Amenities include technologically “smart” learning spaces, an “electronic village” computer lab, fully wired conference rooms, a 621-space parking garage and a University District Bookstore. The  bookstore is open to the public, includes an internet cafe, and services the book requirements of the schools in the Camden University District including Rutgers–Camden and Rowan University. In 2012 a Starbucks coffeeshop opened in the bookstore making it the only Starbucks in downtown Camden.

The Camden City campus services more than two thousand students per semester – about 14% of the Camden County College student population.

Students at the Camden City Campus also have access to the Paul Robeson Library of the Rutgers University-Camden.

William G. Rohrer Campus in Cherry Hill

The Rohrer Campus is Camden County College's third campus location. The two-story building is located at the corner of Route 70 and Springdale Road in Cherry Hill, New Jersey on an  site. In 1997 the Rohrer Charitable Foundation awarded a million dollar grant to the college in order to build an advanced technology training campus for Continuing Education students. The campus opened on April 19, 2000.

The campus provides a high-tech learning environment. A high proportion of classrooms are computer labs, the entire campus has wireless internet, every classroom has a digital projector and computer workstation for the lecturer (and some classrooms have printing capabilities.) The E-Library has 25 workstations allowing access to the College's 50,000+ collection of e-books (and contains technical manuals for Continuing Education courses). The Campus also contains a Barnes and Noble mini-bookstore to provide textbooks, refreshments, and other items to students. On the first floor, a cyber cafe provides internet workstations and several large tables allowing students to gather for study sessions or professors to hold office hours.

The Rohrer Campus has experienced rapid growth. When it opened only 200 students took classes in the building. The number increased to nearly 1,800 students by the Spring 2010 semester. Despite its smaller size compared to the Blackwood and Camden City campuses, students can take all the classes necessary to complete several associate degree programs at the campus. These include degrees in business administration, pre-nursing, psychology, elementary/secondary education, liberal arts, and English. Students taking classes at the Rohrer Campus can also take classes at any of the Camden County College campuses.

On May 1, 2010, the college celebrated the tenth anniversary of the opening of the building. During the reception, a new portrait of William Rohrer was unveiled and continues to hang in the main hall of the campus building.

Technical Institute and Regional Emergency Training Center

Opened in 1969, The Camden County Technical Schools provided vocational, emergency and career retraining services and education. On 1 July 2012, several different services of Camden County (including the Police Academy, the Firefighter Academy, EMT training, and adult vocational training) were consolidated under the direction of Camden County College unifying all post-secondary education in Camden County under Camden County College management. The name was consequently changed to the Technical Institute at Camden County College. This consolidation added two locations to Camden County College. The Technical Institute is located in Sicklerville, NJ while the Emergency Training facility is located in Blackwood, NJ (separate location from the Main Blackwood campus).

 The Technical Institute in Sicklerville, formerly the Camden County Technical Schools, offers vocational training and career retraining services. Completing a course of study at the Technical Institute results in a Certificate from Camden County College and certification in the chosen field. Courses of study include construction (including electrical and plumbing training), automotive training, cosmetology, culinary arts, medical assistant training, and wastewater management. The Technical Institute, in alliance with private businesses, provides apprentice services.

Culinary Institute students gain proficiency in restaurant operations. During the spring semester, students are given the opportunity to gain real-world experience by participating in the “Back Door Café” Restaurant, which is open to the public Thursday evenings at the Sicklerville location. The Back Door Café is a gourmet restaurant where the culinary students prepare and serve meals to the public at a low cost.

Cosmetology students gain the skills necessary to meet the requirements of the New Jersey State Board of Cosmetology. Cosmetology students receive more than 1,000 hours of instruction in a well-equipped salon. The Technical Institute of Camden County’s Cosmetology Clinic offers the services of a salon/spa at low cost.  Students enrolled in the cosmetology program staff a full-service salon each Thursday, September through May. All the students have over 600 hours of study and training.

 Regional Emergency Training Center houses the Firefighter Academy, the EMT training facilities and, as of January 2012, the Camden County Police Academy. The Firefighter Academy also trains volunteer firemen. Four thousand Camden County fire volunteers, representing 58 fire departments, receive practical training at the center each year. Facilities include a “burn house” and a three-story “smokehouse” which are employed to simulate fire and smoke situations.

Enrollment
Camden County College, with its three campuses, is one of the largest public colleges in New Jersey. When the college started, in September 1967, there were 464 students. Enrollment jumped to 2,114 students in its second year. In September 1989, enrollment topped 10,000 students for the first time and, in 1992, enrolled reached 15,000. In total, Camden County College has served the educational needs of over 325,000 students.

Enrollment at the four campuses, as well as the online course program, have all increased over the 2000s. Between 2005 and 2010 the online course program has increased its enrollment credits by 64% from 5,965 credits to 9,773 credits.  The Rohrer Campus, located in Cherry Hill, New Jersey, increased its enrollment credits by 44% over the same period. The Camden City Campus increased its enrollment credits by 27% between 2005 and 2010.

Services, programs, and interesting events

Police Academy Flag Raising

From 1988 to 2011, the Blackwood campus contained the Camden County Police Academy within the Capt. Thomas J. McDonnell Criminal Justice Center. The academy offers introductory police officer training, county correction officer training, and juvenile detention officer training. The academy is a partnership with Camden County College, the Camden County Prosecutor's Office and the Camden County Chiefs of Police.

Members of the police academy would, Monday through Friday, conduct the flag raising and lowering ceremony on campus. The Flag Raising ceremony, which included both a United States National Flag and an MIA/POW Flag, was conducted before the beginning of classes. The Flag lowering ceremony would take place just before the conclusion of the business day of the college. This tradition began in 1988 when the police academy was moved to Camden County College. In September 2011 the Police Academy was moved to the Regional Emergency Training Center of Camden County College in Blackwood, New Jersey. With the move of the Police Academy to another CCC campus the raising and lowering ceremony, which included elaborate parade maneuvers by cadets and the singing of the United States National Anthem, was concluded in May 2011. The video below is the Flag Raising Ceremony at Camden County College by the Camden County Police Academy in April 2011.

Honors Program 
The Honors Program was inaugurated in the Fall 2008 semester.  The purpose of the Honors Program is to create an academically rigorous yet supportive community. Students must maintain a 3.5 GPA to remain in the program. Classes within the Honors Program are smaller – usually capped at 20 students rather than the usual 40 – and are writing intensive. Members of the program are required to participate in three campus-based cultural or service events and will have special social, academic and scholarship opportunities available to them during the school year. Students who graduate as a member of the Honors Program receive a special designation in the Commencement Brochure.

Graduates from the honors program have transferred into honors programs at Rutgers University–Camden, Arizona State University, American University, Drexel University, and Wesleyan University. The honors program also has a partnership with Rutgers–Camden which allows CCC students transferring to Rutgers–Camden to be automatically approved for admittance into the Rutgers–Camden Honors Program.

The honors program is run by Jennifer Hoheisel, Professor of Philosophy and Ethics, who was also the college's 2010 Lindback Award winner for teaching excellence.

Center for Civic Leadership and Responsibility

The Center For Civic Leadership and Responsibility, directed by Professor John Pesda, is part of Camden County College's outreach to the local community. It is the goal of the Center to "create an informed citizenry with a heightened sense of civic responsibility..." The Center organizes two lecture series per year, free of charge to the public, by bringing in prominent academics and intellectuals to speak at the College.

Honors societies on campus

Camden County College currently hosts a number of international, national and state honors societies.

 Kappa Delta Pi
is a national honor society for education majors. Camden County College was the first community college in the United States to have a KDP chapter.

 Mu Alpha Theta
is a national math honor society.

 Phi Theta Kappa
 is an international honor society for two-year colleges.

 Psi Beta
is the national honor society in Psychology for community colleges.

 Alpha Mu Gamma
 is an honor society honoring achievement in foreign languages.

Commencement speakers
The Keynote Speakers at the Commencement ceremonies of Camden County College are distinguished persons from the Jersey/South Jersey locale. They have included sitting United States Senators and Congressmen (Senator Robert G. Torricelli, in 2002; Senator (and later Governor) Jon S. Corzine in 2005; Congressman Robert E. Andrews in 2008; and Senator Robert Menendez in 2012). In 2000 Rear Admiral Thomas A. Seigenthaler, USN (Ret.), gave the keynote speech.

Local political leaders have also spoken at Camden County College, including Camden County Freeholder Riletta L. Cream (2003), NJ State Assemblyman Louis D. Greenwald (2004), and New Jersey Assemblywoman Pamela R. Lampitt (2007).

The third group of speakers has been composed of educators. Dr. Constance Clayton, former Superintendent of Schools for the city of Philadelphia, in 1996; Camden County College President Emerita Phyllis DellaVecchia in 2006; Dr. Jeremy McInerney (Chairman-Department of Classical Studies, University of Penn) in 2010; Ms. Sharon Wedington, retiring Vice President of Camden County College, in 2011; and Dr. Wendell E. Pritchett, Chancellor of Rutgers University-Camden, in 2013.

United States Congressman Donald Norcross was selected as the speaker for 2015. The Commencement ceremony took place on May 16, 2015 at the Blackwood Campus. Deputy Secretary of the Department of Labor Christopher Lu also spoke at the ceremony.

Athletics
Camden County College is a member of the National Junior College Athletic Association (NJCAA) in Region XIX. The college's Cougars and Lady Cougars athletic teams participate at the Division III level, which is the designation for colleges that do not offer athletic scholarships. The College is also a member of the Garden State Athletic Conference, in which it competes against other community colleges in New Jersey. Camden County also competes against junior colleges from Delaware, Maryland, Pennsylvania, and New Jersey. The college fields varsity teams for men in baseball, basketball, cross-country, golf, soccer, track and field, and wrestling, while the women's teams compete in basketball, cross-country, golf, soccer, softball, tennis, and track and field.

In 2014 Camden County College brought back two sports that had been discontinued tennis for women and wrestling for men.

Gary Papa was introduced as Camden County College's new head wrestling coach. The college will compete at the Division III level of the National Junior College Athletic Association. Wrestling at CCC was canceled in the early 1980s. In the first-year tennis returned the team finished 3rd in the Region XIX Tennis Tournament.

Camden County College provides academic and athletic options for student-athletes pursuing an associate degree while continuing their athletic pursuits.

In December 2014 Camden County College named William Banks as the new athletic director.

Women's soccer
The Lady Cougar soccer team has made the playoffs seventeen of its nineteen years including fourteen straight years from 1997 to 2010. It has won four Garden State Championships and two District B championships. The program has been ranked as one of the top 10 programs in the country by the NJCAA four times.

Lindsay Russo, team captain and second-team All-American was honored in 2012 as "Woman of the Year" by the New Jersey's National Association for Girls and Women in Sports.

Notable alumni

 Alex Da Corte (born 1980), artist, featured in the PBS series ART21
 Trymaine Lee (born 1978)  Pulitzer Prize-winning journalist.
 Kenneth LeFevre (born 1945), member of the New Jersey General Assembly from 1996 to 2002.
 Dave Miller (born 1966), former bullpen coach for the Cleveland Indians of Major League Baseball.
 Carol A. Murphy, politician who has represented the 7th Legislative District in the New Jersey General Assembly since 2018.
 Donald Norcross (born 1948, class of 1980), politician who represents New Jersey's 1st congressional district in the U.S. House of Representatives.
 Harrison Rieger (born 1998), professional basketball player.
 Kelly Ripa (born 1970, didn't graduate), television personality, Host of Live with Regis and Kelly, Live with Kelly and Michael, and Live with Kelly and Ryan.
 Mew2King (born 1989), eSports Athlete

See also 

New Jersey County Colleges

References

External links
Official website

Garden State Athletic Conference
Universities and colleges in Camden County, New Jersey
Educational institutions established in 1967
New Jersey County Colleges
Cherry Hill, New Jersey
Gloucester Township, New Jersey
Education in Camden, New Jersey
1967 establishments in New Jersey
Articles containing video clips
NJCAA athletics